Ansetta de Chabert (also known as Ansetta Muckle de Chabert, Ansetta de Chabert Clarke, Annie de Chabert)  (1908–1976), was a businesswoman and civic activist from Saint Croix, U.S. Virgin Islands. She was married first to Ralph de Magne de Chabert Sr., a local civil servant, farmer, and real estate investor. After his death, she married Reverend Clarke, the vicar of St. John's Episcopal Church in Christiansted. After her death she was honoured by Resolution 778, March 1, 1976, of the Virgin Islands legislature, which commemorated her "lifetime of human warmth, noble pursuits and good works throughout the Virgin Islands community". In 2005 she was one of 13 women inducted into the Virgin Islands Women's Hall of Fame.

References

People from Saint Croix, U.S. Virgin Islands
1908 births
1976 deaths
20th-century American businesspeople
20th-century American businesswomen
20th-century American philanthropists